WASP-8 is a binary star system of 9.9 magnitude. The star system is much younger than the Sun at 300 million to 1.2 billion years age, and is heavily enriched in heavy elements, having nearly twice the concentration of iron compared to the Sun.

The primary, WASP-8A, is a magnitude 9.9 main-sequence yellow dwarf star. It is reported to be a G-type star with a temperature of 5600 K and has mass 1.093, a radius 0.976 and a luminosity of 0.79 times that of the Sun. There is a companion star WASP-8B located 4.5 arcseconds away with the same proper motion indicating a stellar binary system. The binarity was confirmed in 2020. The axis orientation of the primary star is uncertain, but it is close to pointing one of the poles to the Earth.

Planetary system
The primary star is orbited by two known extrasolar planets, designated WASP-8b and WASP-8c. WASP-8b was discovered in 2010 by the astronomical transit method and was catalogued as part of the SuperWASP mission. WASP-8c was discovered in late 2013 with the radial velocity method.

See also

 SuperWASP

References

External links
 WASP planets
 

G-type main-sequence stars
Planetary transit variables
Planetary systems with two confirmed planets
Sculptor (constellation)
J23593607-3501530
8
CD-35 16019
Binary stars